Kim Do-Keun (born 2 March 1972) is a South Korean football player. He is currently a reserve team coach of Chunnam Dragons, the club he mostly played for as a player. He played for the South Korea national football team and was a participant at the 1998 FIFA World Cup.

Club statistics

National team statistics

International goals
Results list South Korea's goal tally first.

References

External links
 
 National Team Player Record 
 
 

1972 births
Living people
Association football midfielders
South Korean footballers
South Korean expatriate footballers
South Korea international footballers
Jeonnam Dragons players
Tokyo Verdy players
Cerezo Osaka players
Suwon Samsung Bluewings players
Gyeongnam FC players
K League 1 players
J1 League players
1998 FIFA World Cup players
Footballers at the 1992 Summer Olympics
Olympic footballers of South Korea
Expatriate footballers in Japan
South Korean expatriate sportspeople in Japan
Hanyang University alumni
South Korean expatriate football managers
Sportspeople from Gangwon Province, South Korea